Samsung S3650 (also known as Genio Touch and formally Samsung Corby) is an entry-level touchscreen mobile phone that was released in October 2009 by Samsung. It has a 2 MP camera and a 2.8-inch capacitive TFT touch screen.

There is also a QWERTY and a QWERTY slide version of the phone, Samsung B3210 and Samsung B5310, respectively.

The phone is available in four different colours (limited for rear covers and side mechanical buttons) - White, Pink, Orange or Yellow.

The Samsung GT-S3650W is a variant which has built-in Wi-Fi support.

Features
 Quad-band GSM/EDGE
 2.8-inch capacitive TFT touchscreen of QVGA resolution
 50 MB onboard storage, microSD card slot (up to 8 GB)
 2-megapixel fixed-focus camera with smile detection, QVGA@15fps video recording
 FM radio with RDS
 Find Music recognition service
 TouchWiz and Cartoon UI
 Social networking integration with direct file uploads
 Bluetooth 2.1 with A2DP, USB v.2.0
 Office document viewer
 Smart unlock
 Interchangeable rear covers
 Java-enabled Games
 Photo contact

Corby in South Korea
When the Samsung Corby was released in South Korea, Samsung Electronics changed its specification:
The original Bluetooth Version was 2.1+EDR, the Korean model's Bluetooth version was downgraded to 2.0+EDR.
While the original Corby can play non-DRM MP3 files, the Korean version is restricted to only playing with DRM.
The Korean Corby does not have an office document viewer.
The Korean Corby does not support MP3/WAV ringtones, just MA5 or MMF ringtones.
The Korean Corby display is upgraded from a 2.8" QVGA to 3.0" WQVGA.
The Korean Corby supports T-DMB television.

The price in Korea was high, the equivalent of 394.42 GBP. The model's main rivals are the LG Pep and the Nokia XpressMusic.

In South Korea, boy band 2PM advertised this phone, including a song entitled "My Color".

See also
Samsung Corby Speed

References

External links
 Info about Samsung S3650 Corby, Samsung Italy 
 Stress test of a cell phone Samsung S3650 Corby

Corby
Mobile phones introduced in 2009